Edward William Bloor (born October 12, 1950) is an American novelist and playwright, best known for Tangerine and London Calling.

Biography
Bloor was born in Trenton, New Jersey, son of Edward Bloor and Mary Cowley. Bloor graduated from Notre Dame High School in 1968; the school inducted him into its hall of fame in 2015. He received his Bachelor of Arts degree from Fordham University in 1973. Married Pamela Dixon (a teacher), August 4, 1984. Father to a daughter and a son. Bloor lives in Winter Garden, Florida.

Works
Tangerine, Harcourt, 1997
Crusader, Harcourt, 1999
Story Time, Harcourt, 2001
London Calling, Alfred A. Knopf, 2006
Taken, Alfred A. Knopf, 2008
Memory Lane, Kindle/Nook, 2010
A Plague Year, Alfred A. Knopf, 2011
Summer of Smoke, Kindle/Nook, 2015
Candlemas Eve, Kindle/Nook, 2016
Centennial, SchulerBooks, 2017
Fireside Chats, SchulerBooks, 2018
Ten-Minute Plays, SchulerBooks, 2021
Many Mansions, Chapbook Press, 2019
The Star in the East, Chapbook Press, 2020
The Untimely Adventures of Mimi: Christopher Columbus, (with Amanda Breed), Chapbook Press, 2020
The Untimely Adventures of Mimi: George and Martha Washington, (with Amanda Breed), Chapbook Press, 2021
The Untimely Adventures of Mimi: Betsy Ross, (with Amanda Breed), Chapbook Press, 2023

Awards
For Tangerine
American Library Association Top Ten Best Books for Young Adults, 1997
Edgar Award nomination for Best Young Adult Novel, 1998
American Booksellers Association Pick of the List, 1997
New York Public Library 100 Titles for Reading and Sharing, 1997
"Horn Book" Fanfare Book
A "BCCB" Blue Ribbon Book
For Crusader
New York Public Library Best Books for the Teen Age, 2000
Young Adults' Choices Best of the Rest, 2000
For Story Time
Edgar Award nomination for Best Young Adult Novel, 2005
New York Public Library Best Books for the Teen Age, 2006
For London Calling
New York Public Library Best Books for the Teen Age, 2007
Virginia Readers Choice Selection, 2010
For Taken
The Florida Book Award Silver Medal, 2008
Florida Sunshine State Readers Selection, 2010
For A Plague Year
Pennsylvania Young Readers Choice Award Selection, 2012
For Centennial
FTF Miami, New Year/New Work Play Reading Series Selection, 2020

~External links~

References

1950 births
American children's writers
American young adult novelists
American book editors
Notre Dame High School (New Jersey) alumni
Fordham University alumni
Writers from Orlando, Florida
Writers from Trenton, New Jersey
Living people
20th-century American novelists
20th-century American male writers
21st-century American novelists
American male novelists
People from Winter Garden, Florida
21st-century American male writers
Novelists from New Jersey
Novelists from Florida